John Lloyd Williams (1892 – 31 December 1982) was a Labour Party politician in Scotland.

Williams was educated in Machynlleth, and then at the Central Labour College in London.  He worked as a journalist, and joined the Labour Party.  From 1938 until 1945, he served on Glasgow Corporation.

He was the member of parliament (MP) for Glasgow Kelvingrove from 1945 to 1950, when he was defeated by the Conservative Walter Elliot. Williams challenged Elliot again in 1955 but was unsuccessful.

References

External links 

J. L. Williams MP Papers, National Library of Wales

1892 births
1982 deaths
Members of the Parliament of the United Kingdom for Glasgow constituencies
UK MPs 1945–1950
Scottish Labour MPs